Rajabhita is a village in the Sunderpahari CD block in the Godda subdivision of the Godda district in the Indian state of Jharkhand.

Geography

Location                                          

Overview
Rajmahal coalfield is shown in the map. The entire area is overwhelmingly rural with only small pockets of urbanisation.

Note: The full screen map is interesting. All places marked on the map are linked and you can easily move on to another page of your choice. Enlarge the map to see what else is there – one gets railway links, many more road links and so on.

Demographics
According to the 2011 Census of India, Rajabhita had a total population of 239, of which 118 (49%) were males and 121 (51%) were females.

Civic administration

Police station
Rajabhita police station serves the Sunderpahari CD block.

Tourism
Sundar Dam, located nearby, is the largest irrigation project in the district and a beautiful picnic spot. The dam built across the Sundar River in 1970-78 is 75 ft high.

References

Villages in Godda district